Mr. Wu may refer to:

 Mr. Wu, a 1913 play by Maurice Vernon and Harold Owen
 Mr. Wu, a 1918 book by Louise Jordan Miln
 Mr. Wu (1919 film), a 1919 British drama film
 Mr. Wu (1927 film), a 1927 American silent film starring Lon Chaney
 Mr. Wu, a character referred to in several songs of the 1930s and 1940s by George Formby
 Mr. Wu, a character from the TV series Deadwood
 Mr. Wu, a character from the TV series American Horror Story
 Mr. Wu, a character from the 2012 film Men in Black 3
 Mr. Wu, a character from the TV series Benidorm

See also 
 Woo Hee-young (AKA Mr. Woo, born  1963), Freestyle Football player from South Korea
 Masta Wu (born 1978), Korean rapper
 Wu (disambiguation)